Kenneth Ross is an American independent commercial photographer who specializes in travel, location, people, and corporate photography. He is based in Scottsdale, Arizona.

Career
Educated in the U.S. and Switzerland, Ross began his photography career while residing in Sydney, Australia in 1985. His work has taken him to 107 countries, including 100+ trips to Europe. In 2018 alone, he worked in Argentina, Brazil, Chile, Peru, Japan, Singapore, India, Sri Lanka, Oman, Qatar, among others. Ross has tens of thousands of images on file with a number of stock photo agencies around the world.

His photographs have also appeared in dozens of books published in the U.S. and Europe, including his own book project, Real Taste of Life. His work has been exhibited in Phoenix, New York, Japan and Mexico. In May 2008, Ross had his first museum exhibit, a single artist show at the Art Museum of Monterey, Mexico. His work has been featured in How to Shoot Location Photography: Give It a Shot, Create magazine (fall 2005) and Photomedia magazine (spring 2006). Ross was interviewed by WhoHub, a directory of interviews with professionals in the fields of communication, arts, humanities, technology, marketing, and any other activity with a creative flair. He previously worked with Through Each Others Eyes (TEOE), an Arizona not-for-profit corporation, whose goal is to promote international understanding via the medium of photography.

In the past few years he has become more active in his non-profit group, The Elisabeth Kübler-Ross (EKR) Foundation. The EKR Foundation has foreign chapters in twelve countries that continue the legacy of his mother. Principal areas of focus within the foundation include: hospice, palliative care, and grief. In 2018 Stanford University acquired all the archives of Dr. Kübler-Ross. For the 50th anniversary of, "On Death & Dying" Ross appeared on various interviews including the BBC's, "Witness History" speaking about his mother.

Personal life
Ken Ross is the son of psychiatrist and author Dr. Elisabeth Kübler-Ross and Emanuel "Manny" Ross, and serves as president of the Elisabeth Kübler-Ross Foundation.

Awards 

American Society of Media Photographers – 2008

2nd prize  Portfolios.com contest – 2007

National Design Institute: 2006 Calendar

1st prize  Colors of India contest – 2006
 
1st Prize  Modern Photography Magazine – 1985

Exhibits 

Summer 2008 | Nightingale Gallery, Taos, New Mexico

May 8 - June 2, 2008 | Art Museum of Monterey, Mexico (Museo El Centenaric)

March 7–9, 2008 | Karmic Calamity Gallery, 610 East Roosevelt, Phoenix, AZ

Feb 12 - March 14, 2008 | Swiss Embassy, Tokyo

November 2007 | Tokyo, Japan International House : “Cultures of the World“  Exhibit

September 2006 | Tokyo, Japan International House : “Real Taste of Life“  Exhibit

November 2005 - November 2006 | Dallas, Texas Heroes for Humanity Gallery - “Portraits“

November 2004 | Tokyo, Japan International House : Kabyama Room - “Tokyo, Japan“  Exhibit

November 2003 | Hermosillo, Sonora, Mexico City Hall - “Sister Cities Project“ Exhibit

October 2003 | Phoenix, Arizona Paper Heart Gallery - “Faces of Asia“ Exhibit

July - September 2003 | Scottsdale, Arizona Borders Books - Book signing for “Real Taste of Life"

October 2002 | New York City, New York The Belinki Gallery (Soho) - "9/11 Remembrance"

May - June 2002 | Himeji, Japan City Hall - "Through Each Other‘s Eyes“ Exhibit

April 2002 | Phoenix, Arizona City Hall - "Through Each Other‘s Eyes“ Exhibit

May 1991 | New York City, New York Gray Advertising - “Around the World“ Exhibit

References 

Living people
Photographers from Arizona
People from Scottsdale, Arizona
Year of birth missing (living people)
Commercial photographers
20th-century American photographers
21st-century American photographers
American people of Swiss-German descent